Regow may refer to:

Regów, a village in Grodzisk Mazowiecki County, in east-central Poland
Regow, Brandenburg, a place in the state of Brandenburg, Germany